Jorge Eliézer Echeverría Montilva (born 13 February 2000) is a Venezuelan football player who plays as midfielder for Aragua in Venezuelan Primera División.

References

2000 births
Living people
Venezuelan footballers
Venezuela youth international footballers
Venezuelan Primera División players
Caracas FC players
Association football midfielders
People from San Cristóbal, Táchira
21st-century Venezuelan people